Caucete is a city in the province of San Juan, Argentina, located 25 km southeast of the provincial capital, on the junction of National Routes 20 and 141.

See also

1977 San Juan earthquake

References
 

Populated places in San Juan Province, Argentina
Chonan languages
Cities in Argentina
Argentina
San Juan Province, Argentina